Gurrea or Gurréa may refer to:

People
Carlos de Gurrea, Duke of Villahermosa (1634–1692), 9th Duque de Villahermosa, a Spanish nobleman, viceroy and governor
Ignacio de Luzán Claramunt de Suelves y Gurrea (1702–1754), Spanish critic and poet
Marcial del Adalid y Gurréa (1826–1881), Spanish composer

Places
Alcalá de Gurrea, municipality in the province of Huesca, Aragon, Spain
Gurrea de Gállego, municipality in the province of Huesca, Aragon, Spain